Gerard Francisco Parco Timoner III  (born January 26 1968) is a Filipino Catholic priest who serves as the 88th Master of the Order of Preachers, better known as the Dominicans, since 13 July 2019, the first Asian to hold the position.

He is also a Professor of Theology at the University of Santo Tomas in Manila and since 2014 a member of the International Theological Commission.

Early life and education
Gerard Francisco P. Timoner III was born on 26 January 1968 in Daet, Camarines Norte, Philippines to Francisco Timoner Jr. and Lilia Parco. He attended the Augustinian-administered La Consolacion College – Daet, graduating first honors from grade school in 1981, and as high school valedictorian in 1985. He obtained his licenciate in philosophy at the Philippine Dominican Center for International Studies in 1991 and a licenciate in theology at the University of Santo Tomas in 1994. He joined the Dominicans in 1985 and professed his vows in 1989. His brother, Ronald Anthony, is also a priest who is currently the Vicar General of the Diocese of Daet.

Vocation
Timoner was ordained a priest in 1995. He earned additional degrees in sacred theology and intercultural theology  at the Catholic University of Nijmegen in 2004.

On 23 September 2014, Pope Francis named him a member of the International Theological Commission. He is the fourth Filipino to have that distinction.

In December 2018, he was one of the leaders of a delegation of priests that searched the Dominican Mausoleum in Rome's Campo Verano cemetery for the remains of the first native-born Filipino ever consecrated a bishop, Jorge Barlin (born 1850–1909), who served as the Bishop of Nueva Caceres until his death in the city in 1909.

He was Prior Provincial of the Dominican Province of the Philippines and then Socius of the Master for Asia-Pacific before being elected Master of the Order on 13 July 2019. As the head of the Dominicans, he is also the ex officio Grand Chancellor of the Pontifical University of St. Thomas Aquinas.

References

External links
 

1968 births
Living people
People from Camarines Norte
People from Quezon City
Radboud University Nijmegen alumni
University of Santo Tomas alumni
Members of the Dominican Order
Academic staff of the University of Santo Tomas
21st-century Filipino Roman Catholic priests
20th-century Filipino Roman Catholic priests
Masters of the Order of Preachers